Events from the year 1682 in China.

Incumbents 
 Kangxi Emperor (21st year)

Events 
 The Tibetan desi (regent) Sangye Gyatso concealed the death of the 5th Dalai Lama in 1682, and only informed the emperor in 1697
 The official Qing account of the Revolt of the Three Feudatories, entitled P’ing-ting san-ni fang-lüeh, compiled by Ledehun, Han T’an, and others, begins
 Sino-Russian border conflicts

Deaths
 Zhu Zhiyu (1600–1682), courtesy name Luyu (魯璵), and commonly known as Zhu Shunshui (朱舜水; romaji: Shu Shunsui) in Japan, was one of the greatest scholars of Confucianism in the Ming dynasty and Edo Japan. Zhu remains the best remembered of the Ming political refugees in Tokugawa Japan and the one who contributed most to Japanese education and intellectual history.

References

 
 .

 
China